Osredek may refer to:
 
In Croatia:
 Osredek Desinićki, a village near Desinić
 Osredek Žumberački, a village near Samobor

In Slovenia:
Osredek, Zagorje ob Savi
Osredek, Cerknica
Osredek, Velike Lašče
Osredek, Šentjur
Osredek pri Zrečah
Osredek pri Hubajnici
Osredek pri Dobrovi
Osredek pri Podsredi
Osredek nad Stično
Osredek pri Krmelju
Osredek pri Trški Gori